Antonio Sánchez de Neyra Castro (16 March 1884 - Unknown) was a Spanish footballer who played as a forward for Madrid FC, Club Español de Madrid and RCD Espanyol. He was one of the most important footballers in the amateur beginnings of Madrid FC, being one of the main architects of the team's rise to national dominance in the 1900s. He was one of the members of the first Board of Directors of Madrid FC presided by Juan Padrós in the club's official establishment on 6 March 1902.

Outstanding goalscorer and a skillful dribbler, he reached the final of the Copa del Rey numerous times with three different clubs, becoming over the years one of the footballers who added the most presences in finals, but only won one. Despite being an outstanding football player, a sport to which he owes his career, he was also an outstanding athlete who also performed in other modalities such as baseball, cycling, swimming, gymnastics, and discus throwing among others, even participating in the Spanish Athletics Championships.

His brother Pedro Sánchez de Neyra Castro, was one of the founders and the first president of the Spanish Football Federation in 1909 as well as the first president of the Spanish Velocipedism Federation in 1896.

Biography 
Neyra was born in La Habana, Captaincy General of Cuba, in Cuba, because his father, the cavalry colonel Don Antonio Sánchez de Neyra Romero, was stationed there, when the country was under the sovereignty of the Spanish Empire. They moved to Madrid when he was still young. in Madrid, he was part of the Sky Foot-ball club, the first club that existed in the capital, however, in 1900, a new conflict between Sky Football members caused some of them to leave (including Neyra) and create a new club, Madrid Football Club, currently known as Real Madrid CF, with the official creation of the club being held on 6 March 1902 in the back room of Al Capricho, and Neyra was among the presents that day, and become one of the members of the first Board of Directors of Madrid FC presided by Juan Padrós.

He then become one of the first footballers of the newly formed Madrid FC at the age of just 18, playing as a forward. Together with Pedro Parages, Federico Revuelto and the Giralt brothers (Mario, José and Armando), he was part of the historic Madrid team that played in the first-ever Copa del Rey in 1903, and it was he who netted the opening goal in the final although they lost 2–3 to Athletic Club.

Despite some encouraging first steps in the white club, it was possibly the fact of losing the 1903 Cup final that caused a convulsive situation within the entity that led to the departure of several of its founding members, including he and Armando Giralt, abandoning Madrid FC in October 1903 to refound Club Español de Madrid (the club had already been founded in 1901, but collapsed in the summer of 1903) and of which he was named captain. It was common at the time for players to leave their respective teams to join or found others due to the still dispersed and confusing growth of football, in fact, some of the others departures marched to found the Moncloa Football Club. Under Neyra's leadership, Español de Madrid won the second Centro Championships in 1903–04, hence becoming the second regional champions in Spain after Moderno Football Club who had won the inaugural edition in 1903. In the 1904 Copa del Rey, Español de Madrid was unable to participate in the final, and so, Athletic were declared winners again.

He stayed loyal to Español de Madrid for three years, until 1906, when he saw that it was the "madridistas" - a nickname that would come years later - who began to have a notable growth both institutionally and sportingly, so he returned to the club that he had left in 1903, and participated in Madrid's 1907 and 1908 Copa del Rey winning campaigns, missing the final of the former, but redeeming himself by being the top scorer in the 1908 edition thanks to his goal in the 1908 final against Vigo Sporting, which ended in a 2–1 win.

In 1908, he headed back to Español, and from there to another back-to-back Copa del Rey finals in 1909 and 1910, Neyra's third and fourth in a row, but unlike in Madrid, both finals ended in losses, first to Club Ciclista in 1909 final and then to FC Barcelona in the 1910 final (FEF), and remarkably, he lost the latter in a similar fashion to 1903: being 2–0 up at half-time just to ended up on the losing side 2–3. Neyra then reached a fifth final in a row, now with RCD Espanyol, and just like in 1903, he lost to Athletic Club despite scoring in a 1–3 loss. It was in this club where the news of his sports activity was interrupted, suggesting he retired no long after that.

Honours

Club
Club Español de Madrid
Centro Championship:
Champions (1): 1903–04
Copa del Rey:
Runner-up (3): 1904, 1909 and 1910

-

Madrid FC
Centro Championship:
Champions (1): 1906–07 and 1907–08
Copa del Rey:
Champions (2): 1907 and 1908
Runner-up (1): 1903

-

RCD Espanyol
Copa del Rey:
Runner-up (1): 1911

See also 
 List of Real Madrid CF players

References 

1880s births
20th-century deaths
Year of death unknown
Date of death missing
Spanish footballers
Real Madrid CF players
Sportspeople from Havana
Footballers from Madrid
RCD Espanyol footballers
Cuban footballers
Migrants from Spanish Cuba to Spain